Wike is a desktop application for Linux and *nix systems written in Python and GTK to read and browse Wikipedia. It provides access to all of the encyclopedia in a native application with a simpler view and distraction free environment. It supports features such as multiple tabs, recent article list, GNOME Shell search integration, dark mode, and bookmark management. It does not support editing Wikipedia or signing in, and does not support other projects from the Wikimedia Foundation such as Wiktionary. Wike is a part of the GNOME Circle project, and is available on Fedora Linux through DNF, in an Ubuntu PPA, in the AUR, and on Flathub.

References

GNOME Applications